The Dewoin language, also known as De, Dey, or Dei, is a Kru language of the Niger–Congo language family. It is spoken primarily near the coastal areas of Montserrado County in western Liberia, including the capital Monrovia. It has a lexical similarity of 0.72 with the Bassa language.

In 1991, Dewoin was spoken by 8,100 people.

See also 
 Languages of Africa

References 

Kru languages
Languages of Liberia